Sarah Lotz is a screenwriter and award-winning novelist whose previous work has been translated into over twenty languages.

Biography
Sarah Lotz was born in Wolverhampton, England. She left home as a teenager and briefly lived in Paris and Israel before settling in South Africa, where she lived for about twenty years, working as a writer and artist. She married but the marriage ended in divorce.  She received an honours degree in English at the University of Cape Town. In 2015 she returned to live in the UK. Lotz publishes under her own name and a number of pseudonyms. She is, with author Louis Greenberg, the urban horror novelist S.L Grey, with her daughter Savannah Lotz she is Lily Herne and she is Helena S. Paige when she writes with Helen Moffett and Paige Nick. Lotz is published by Hodder and Little, Brown. She lives in Cape Town and the UK.

Bibliography
 The Three (2012)   
 Dark Harvest (2014)
 Day Four (2015)
 Pompidou Posse (2015)   
 Skin Deep (2016)
 Body in the Woods (2017)
 The White Road (2017)   
 Reborn (2018)     
 Missing Person (2019)
 Impossible Us (2022)

As SL Grey
The Mall (2011)
The Ward (2012)
The New Girl (2013)
The Ward / The Mall / The New Girl (2015)
The Apartment (2016)

As Lily Herne
Deadlands (2012)
Death of a Saint (2013)
The Army Of The Lost (2014)
Ash Remains (2016)

References and sources

People from Wolverhampton
Writers from Cape Town
21st-century British women writers
21st-century South African women writers
Living people
21st-century British screenwriters
1971 births